This list documents the status of formal government-standards, regulations, and certification of organic farming and organic food.

List of countries with regulations on organic agriculture

Countries with regulations in development

References

Agriculture-related lists

Organic agriculture